White River Falls State Park is a state park in north central Oregon.

The focus of the park is the falls where wild and scenic White River plunges  from a basalt shelf. At the base of the falls are the ruins of a hydropower plant which supplied electricity to north central Oregon from 1910 to 1960.

The falls are located at river mile (RM) 3 of the White River which flows into the Deschutes at RM 46.5.

There are no fees to use the park and it is open mid-March through the end of October.

See also 
 List of Oregon State Parks

State parks of Oregon
Parks in Wasco County, Oregon